LuneOS is a mobile operating system (OS) based on the Linux kernel and currently developed by WebOS Ports community. With a user interface based on direct manipulation, LuneOS is designed primarily for touchscreen mobile devices such as smartphones and tablet computers. The OS uses touch inputs that loosely correspond to real-world actions, like swiping, tapping, pinching, and reverse pinching to manipulate on-screen objects, and a virtual keyboard.

LuneOS is the open source successor for Palm/HP webOS where the user interface is rebuilt from scratch by using the latest technologies available (Qt 5.15.0 / QML, Qt WebEngine, etc). It is not intended to compete with iPhone or Android on features. All devices can have a LuneOS port if they have a CyanogenMod / LineageOS ROM available that works. LuneOS uses the minimal Android System Image that is created using Halium which in turn is based upon CyanogenMod / LineageOS.

Currently, the system is still in alpha, with some internal hardware not supported and some applications still buggy. It can be updated without a reinstall. It has the feel of the webOS formerly used on Palm and HP hardware, including a cards-based multitasking system and Universal Search. It has been described as "a niche mobile operating system maintained by enthusiasts".

Release schedule

See also

 Enyo
 Access Linux Platform
 Ubuntu Touch - Linux Ubuntu for smartphones and tablets.

References

External links 
 
 LuneOS Forums

2014 software
ARM operating systems
Free mobile software
Mobile Linux
Mobile operating systems
Smartphone operating systems
Software using the Apache license